Everlife is the third studio album by Everlife, and the first and only album on Buena Vista Records released on February 20, 2007.

Track listing

Bonus tracks
 "I Can Love You"* - 3:50
 "Heaven Open Your Eyes"* - 3:24

(*CBA exclusive tracks, meaning only available in Christian bookstores such as Family Christian and LifeWay)

Notes
 The CD was originally titled "Now or Never", after the 10th track on the album
 The song "Faded" is a cover of Kate DeAraugo and is co-written by The Veronicas. Also, Cascada did a remix of this song.
 The song "I Could Get Used To This" is a cover originally recorded by The Veronicas for their debut album The Secret Life Of....
 The song "What I Like About You" is a cover of The Romantics's 1980s hit single.
 The song "Find Yourself In You" originally appeared on Hannah Montana Soundtrack and was used in a TV spot for the film Penelope.
 The song "Look Through My Eyes" is a cover which originally appeared on Disneymania 4.
 The song "Real Wild Child" is also a cover which originally appeared on The Wild Soundtrack.
 The song "Go Figure" originally appeared on the Go Figure Soundtrack.
 The song "Angels Cry" originally appeared on Everlife's 2004 second album Everlife but has been re-recorded for this album.
 The song "Heaven Open Your Eyes", which is exclusive to CBA stores, originally appeared on Everlife's 2004 second album Everlife but has been re-recorded for this album.

Notes 

2007 albums
Everlife albums
Buena Vista Records albums